Green Lakes are six lakes located in northeastern part of Vilnius, Lithuania. They are a part of Verkiai Regional Park.

The six lakes are named: 
 Balsys Lake
 Gulbinas Lake
 Mažasis (Little) Gulbinas Lake
 Akis Lake
 Raistelis Lake
 Baraukos Akis Lake

Lakes of Lithuania
Geography of Vilnius